Kyŏnghŭng County is a kun, or county, in North Hamgyong province, North Korea. Formerly known as Ŭndŏk County, from 1977 to 2010.

The county borders the People's Republic of China to the northeast. With the exception of the southwest, it is dominated by low hills, with occasional plains. The highest point is Songjinsan. The dominant river is the Tumen, which separates the county from China. The level ground along the Tumen is developed, but approximately 80% of the county is forested.

Mining, particularly coal mining, is the chief industry in Undok, where lignite is found; Undok is the site of the Aoji Coal Mine.  In addition, farming and livestock raising are widespread. The chief crops are maize, rice, soybeans, and potatoes. The Aoji-ri Chemical Complex is located in the county as well.

Undok lies on the Hambuk Line and Hoeam Line railroads.

History
Under Joseon period "Kyunghung", the ancient name of Undok, was one of the six post/garrisons establish under the order of  King Sejong the Great of Joseon in 1433, to safeguard his people from the hostile Chinese and Manchurian nomads living in Manchuria

Notable personalities
Lee Gyung-Rok the prefect of Kyŏnghŭng

Administrative divisions
Kyŏnghŭng County is divided into 1 town ("Ŭp") 12 villages ("Ri") and 3 worker's districts ("Rodongjagu").

See also
Geography of North Korea
Administrative divisions of North Korea
 Tumen River Bridge

External links
Location of the four forts and the six posts

Counties of North Hamgyong